Jannick Lupescu (born 16 July 1993) is a Dutch tennis player.

Lupescu has a career high ATP singles ranking of 841 achieved on 1 November 2010. He also has a career high ATP doubles ranking of 792 achieved on 14 November 2011. Lupescu has won one ITF doubles title.

Lupescu won the 2010 Australian Open boys' doubles title, partnering Justin Eleveld. They defeated Kevin Krawietz and Dominik Schulz in the final. Lupescu had a career high junior ranking of 9, achieved in 2011.

Junior Grand Slam finals

Doubles

References

External links
 
 

1993 births
Living people
Dutch male tennis players
Grand Slam (tennis) champions in boys' doubles
Australian Open (tennis) junior champions
Dutch people of Romanian descent